Hartwig Bleidick (born 26 December 1944) is a former football defender.

References

External links
 

Living people
1944 births
German footballers
Germany international footballers
Footballers at the 1972 Summer Olympics
Olympic footballers of West Germany
West German footballers
Association football defenders
Borussia Mönchengladbach players
Bundesliga players